Mount Pilkington is located on the border of Alberta and British Columbia, between Mount Freshfield and Waitabit Peak. It was named in 1898 after Charles Pilkington. Mount Pilkington is located on the Continental Divide between the Campbell Icefield and the Freshfield Icefield.

The Pilkington Ascent 
On August 5th, 2019, Dr. Matthew B.G. Pilkington, Charles Pilkington's great-great-grandnephew, became the first Pilkington to summit the peak. Matthew's ascent was followed by his son, Dante G.M. Pilkington, who became the second Pilkington to summit Mount Pilkington.

See also
 List of peaks on the British Columbia–Alberta border
 List of mountains in the Canadian Rockies

References

Mountains of Banff National Park
Three-thousanders of Alberta
Three-thousanders of British Columbia
Canadian Rockies